Uchaud is a commune in the Gard department in southern France. Uchaud station has rail connections to Nîmes, Avignon and Montpellier.

Population

See also
Communes of the Gard department
 Costières de Nîmes AOC

References

Communes of Gard